Camden Riviere (born 1987) is an American left-handed real tennis player and current world champion. He became world champion on May 21, 2016, defeating long-time holder Robert Fahey 7 sets to 2 at Riviere's home court, the National Tennis Club, Newport, Rhode Island. Two years later, at Riviere's first defense of the title, Fahey reclaimed the title beating Riviere by 7 sets to 5 at Queen's Club, London. Riviere regained the title from Fahey at the 2022 World Championship played at Prested Hall in Feering, Essex, England, winning by 7 sets to 5.

Since September 2013, Riviere has been ranked world number 1.

Early life

Camden Scott Riviere was born May 20, 1987 in Charleston, South Carolina, but was raised in nearby Aiken, South Carolina. He started playing real tennis at age 5 with his father Rhett and grandfather Hank, and played his first tournament at age 7. Camden's first coach was the Aiken professional (at that time) Mark Devine. As a junior, Camden competed on the American Junior Squads including the Clothier Cup team, and the Van Alen team. During his early teens Camden competed as a top-level amateur, winning such tournaments as the US Amateur and the Tuxedo Gold Racquet. Camden also played for the United States on the Bathurst Cup Team.

Professional life

In May 2005, at age 17, Camden moved to the UK and turned professional, working at Hampton Court Palace under Chris Ronaldson. After a year in the UK, Camden returned to the US and became a touring professional based out of Newport, RI. From 2006 to 2008 Camden trained in Newport under coach Josh Bainton, and continued to rise up the ranking, until finally reaching the ranking of #5 in the world in 2008. This allowed Camden to qualify for the World Championship Eliminators, where at the age of 20, he defeated the other top 4 players in the world, and qualified to challenge for the World Championship being narrowly defeated by Rob Fahey 7 sets to 5.

In September 2008 Camden joined the team at the Tennis and Racquet Club, Boston, as a real tennis, racquets, and squash professional. Over the next three years Riviere would continue to rise in the rankings to #2 in the world, and won his first major tournament, the U.S. Open, in Philadelphia on March 1, 2009.

In November 2011, Camden returned to being a touring professional based out of Charleston, South Carolina. Since returning to a touring professional state Camden has accumulated a mass of titles and on September 1, 2013 became the #1 ranked player in the world. Since the world ranking system was created in 1991, no American had been ranked number 1 in the world. Rob Fahey had been number one for the past twenty years, but in late August 2013 Riviere passed Fahey and has since retained the number 1 ranking.

Career as World #1

2014 saw another great year for Camden, as he won 3 out of the 4 Opens (US, French, British), won a majority of the Professional events, and earned his second challenge for the World Championship. Camden was defeated by Rob Fahey in the World Championship at the Royal Melbourne Tennis Club 7 sets to 3 in May.

2015 started well for Riviere, winning the Australian Open Singles and Doubles titles in January, completing the grand slam (holder of all 4 Opens at one time – US, French, British, Australian) in both singles and doubles. In February, Camden defended his US Open Singles and Doubles titles, winning both for the third consecutive year in a row, as well as extending his lead as the #1 ranked player in the world. In June 2015 Camden became the World Champion of Doubles alongside Tim Chisholm, winning the event hosted in Tuxedo Park, NY over the previous champions by a score of 5 sets to 0. Following the WCD, Camden successfully defended his US Professional Singles title, winning the tournament for the 6th consecutive year in a row, and in the process completing an undefeated 2014/2015 season.

In July 2015 Camden took over the role of Head Professional at the National Tennis Club in Newport, RI. This would mark this end of his season though, as a reoccurring shoulder injury forced Camden to take the remainder of the year off in order to do physical therapy.

2016 could go down as Camden's best year yet, winning his 4th consecutive (and 5th overall) US Open Singles and Doubles titles, and in late May becoming the Real Tennis World Champion. Camden defeated Rob Fahey by a score of 7 sets to 2 in Newport, RI at the 2016 Real Tennis World Championship. This marks the first time in over 42 years that an American has held the title, and made Riviere only the 5th American overall to hold it. Camden was the 25th holder of the Real Tennis World Championship, the longest running world championship of any sport. Camden followed up this accomplishment by winning his 7th consecutive US Professional Singles title in Newport in June.

On January 12, 2017, the General Assembly of South Carolina adopted a Concurrent Resolution, Bill 3454, "to congratulate and celebrate South Carolina son Camden Riviere for his impressive accomplishment of winning the 2016 real tennis World Championship and to wish him well in his future endeavors."

In April 2017 at Prested Hall Real Tennis Club, Camden and his doubles partner, Tim Chisholm, defended their World Championship Doubles title in the most dramatic and spectacularly athletic fashion. Challengers Ricardo Smith and Robert Fahey won the first four sets in a row on day 1 of the challenge. Because it was a best of 9-set-match, Riviere and Chisholm had to win five sets in a row on day 2, a tall order even for the world's best. And yet, they did it. The final score was: 4/6 2/6 2/6 4/6 6/3 6/3 6/1 6/1 6/3.

In April 2018 in the first defence of his World Championship title, Riviere lost to former champion Robert Fahey by 7 sets to 5 at Queen's Club, London. The final score was: 6/4 3/6 5/6 0/6 6/5 6/4 6/3 6/1 5/6 0/6 6/3 6/3.

In 2020, he again was selected as challenger. However, due to the pandemic, the challenge was postponed until September 2022. Riviere beat Fahey by 7 sets to 5: 5/6 6/3 4/6 6/2 6/2 6/2 6/3 5/6 6/3 3/6 5/6 6/2.

Singles titles
 World Championship: 2016 - 2018, 2022 - Present
 Australian Open: 2015, 2017, 2019
 British Open: 2014, 2016, 2017, 2019, 2022
 French Open: 2012, 2013, 2014, 2016, 2017, 2019, 2022
 U.S. Open: 2009, 2013, 2014, 2015, 2016, 2017, 2018, 2019, 2020, 2021, 2022, 2023
 Real Tennis Champions Trophy: 2017, 2018
 U.S. National Open: 2009, 2013, 2014, 2015, 2017, 2018, 2019, 2021, 2022 
 IRTPA Championships (formerly UK Professional): 2012, 2013, 2014, 2017
 U.S. Professional / Schochet Cup: 2010, 2011, 2012, 2013, 2014, 2015, 2016, 2017, 2018, 2019, 2021, 2022
 European Open: 2008, 2009, 2012, 2013
 Victorian Open: 2013

Doubles titles
 World Championship: 2015 – Present (with Tim Chisholm)
 French Open: 2007, 2008, 2011, 2012, 2013, 2014, 2016, 2017, 2019, 2022
 US Open: 2006, 2009, 2013, 2014, 2015, 2016, 2017, 2018, 2019, 2020, 2021, 2022
 British Open: 2014, 2016, 2017, 2019, 2022
 Australian Open: 2015, 2017, 2019

See also
 List of real tennis world champions

References

External links
 Official site

1987 births
American real tennis players
Living people
Salve Regina University alumni
Sportspeople from Charleston, South Carolina
Sportspeople from Aiken, South Carolina